is a railway station on the AbukumaExpress in the city of Date, Fukushima Japan.

Lines

Station layout
Kamihobara Station has one side platform serving a single bi-directional track.

Adjacent stations

History
Kamihobara Station opened on July 1, 1988.

Passenger statistics
In fiscal 2015, the station was used by an average of 227 passengers daily (boarding passengers only).

Surrounding area
The station is located in a rural area surrounded by rice fields.

See also
 List of Railway Stations in Japan

External links

  Abukuma Express home page

References

Railway stations in Fukushima Prefecture
Abukuma Express Line
Railway stations in Japan opened in 1988
Date, Fukushima